Owen Evans may refer to:

 Owen Evans (politician) (1876–1945), Liberal Party politician from Wales
 Jem Evans (Owen James Evans, 1867–1942), Welsh rugby union half-back
 Owen Evans (rugby union) (born 1989), Welsh rugby union prop forward
 Owen Evans (Australian footballer) (1916–1972), Australian rules footballer
 Owen Evans (priest) (1864–1937), Anglican priest and author
 Owen Evans (Welsh footballer) (born 1996), Welsh football goalkeeper
 Tom Owen-Evans (born 1997), English footballer
 Owen P. Evans (1927–2018), American football player and coach
Owen Evans (civil servant), Welsh civil servant
Owen Evans, drummer for AJJ (band) since 2016, as well as having his own project called Roar